Rudy the Fifth is Ricky Nelson and the Stone Canyon Band's country rock album that was released on October 4, 1971.

Track listing
All tracks composed by Ricky Nelson, except where indicated.
"This Train" – 2:34
"Just Like a Woman" (Bob Dylan) – 4:58
"Sing Me a Song" – 3:21
"The Last Time Around" – 4:21
"Song for Kristin" – 1:14
"Honky Tonk Woman" (Mick Jagger, Keith Richards) – 4:11
"Feel So Good" (Leonard Lee) – 2:59
"Life" – 2:57
"Thank You Lord" – 4:00
"Song for Kristin" – 1:15
"Love Minus Zero/No Limit" (Dylan) – 2:55
"Gypsy Pilot" – 4:06

Personnel

Musicians
Ricky Nelson – guitar, piano, lead vocals
Allen Kemp – lead guitar, backing vocals
Randy Meisner – bass guitar, backing vocals
Tom Brumley – steel guitar
Patrick Shanahan – drums
Andy Belling – piano

Production
Producer: Rick Nelson
Recording engineer: Michael "Nemo" Shields
Photography: Kent McCord
Artistic design: John C. Leprevost

Charts

References

Ricky Nelson albums
1971 albums
Country rock albums
Decca Records albums